Ballynagall is a townland in County Westmeath, Ireland.

Ballynagall is one of 8 townlands of the civil parish of Portnashangan, and 11 townlands of the civil parish of Tyfarnham, both in the barony of Corkaree in the Province of Leinster. 
The southern boundary of the townland includes part of Scragh Bog. The north–west boundary of the townland follows the River Gaine, a tributary of the River Inny.

The neighbouring townlands are: Garrysallagh and Loughanstown to the north, Cartron, Kilmaglish, Knockdrin Demesne and Quarry to the east, Brockagh to the south and Culleen More and Portnashangan to the west.

In the 1911 census of Ireland there were 21 houses and 92 inhabitants in the townland.

Buildings

Ballynegall House, a former country house located in the townland, has fallen into ruins since 1981.

The former Ballynagall Chapel in the southeast of the townland is now used as a restaurant.

References

External links
Ballynagall at the IreAtlas Townland Data Base
Ballynagall at Townlands.ie
Ballynagall at Logainm.ie

Townlands of County Westmeath